Griparna is a speedway club from Nyköping in Sweden, who compete in the Allsvenskan. Their home track is at the Nyköpings Motorstadion which is located to the North of Nyköping.

History
Griparna Speedway was founded in 1949. The team compete in the second tier of Swedish speedway, now called the Allsvenskan (National League). They won Division 2 North in 1987. The club finished 6th during the 2022 Swedish Speedway season.

Season summary

Teams

2022 team
  Kim Nilsson 
  Peter Ljung
  Anton Karlsson 
  Silas Hoegh
  Theo Bergqvist
  John Lindman 
  Kenneth Hansen 
  Patrick Skaarup
  Sammy van Dyck
  Alexander Liljekvist
  Jonathan Ejnermark

References 

Swedish speedway teams
Sport in Södermanland County